Julian Ross Wood (born 21 November 1968 in Winchester, Hampshire) is a retired English cricketer. Wood was a left-handed batsman and a right-arm medium pace bowler. He was educated at Leighton Park School in Berkshire.

Wood made his Hampshire first-class debut against local rivals Sussex in the 1989 County Championship. The same year Wood would also make his one-day debut against Northamptonshire. Wood would play for Hampshire until the end of the 1993 County Championship when he was released by Hampshire. Wood represented them in 27 first-class and 42 one-day matches.

In 1994 Wood signed for Berkshire. He represented the club in the Minor Counties Championship, playing 66 matches for Berkshire. Wood also represented them in 33 Minor Counties Trophy matches, as well as 13 one-day matches that had List-A status in the English domestic one-day cricket competition. Wood played his final List-A match against Gloucestershire in 2005. After twelve years with Berkshire, Wood retired from all forms of cricket during the 2006 Minor Counties Championship.

His father, Ross Wood, was an umpire.

References

External links
Julian Wood on Cricinfo
Julian Wood on CricketArchive
Matches and detailed statistics for Julian Wood

1968 births
Living people
Cricketers from Winchester
English cricketers
Hampshire cricketers
Berkshire cricketers
Berkshire cricket captains